Robert Pagman (by 1497 – 1552) was the member of the Parliament of England for Great Bedwyn for the parliament of 1547.

References

External links 

Members of Parliament for Great Bedwyn
English MPs 1547–1552
1552 deaths
Year of birth uncertain
15th-century births